"Million Clouds" is a song recorded by Japanese singer Maaya Sakamoto. It was released as a single on July 27, 2016, through FlyingDog. It was written by Sakamoto and composed by Swedish singer-songwriter Frida Sundemo. The song served as the opening theme to the Tokyo MX anime Amanchu!.

Chart performance
The single debuted at number 24 on the Oricon Singles Chart, with 8,000 copies on its first week. It went on to chart for six weeks, selling a reported total of 11,000 copies.

Track listing

Credits and personnel
Personnel

 Vocals, backing vocals, production – Maaya Sakamoto
 Songwriting – Maaya Sakamoto, Frida Sundemo
 Arrangement, piano, programming, electronic keyboard – Shin Kōno
 Guitar – Tsuneo Imahori
 Percussion – Izumi Misawa
 Strings – Chieko Kinbara Strings
 Mixing – Toshihiko Miyoshi
 Engineering – Hiroaki Yamazaki
 Mastering – Hiroshi Kawasaki

Charts

References

2016 songs
2016 singles
Anime songs
Songs written by Maaya Sakamoto
Maaya Sakamoto songs
FlyingDog singles